The 3rd U-boat Flotilla (German 3. Unterseebootsflottille), also known as  Lohs Flotilla, was the third operational U-boat unit in Nazi Germany's Kriegsmarine. Founded on 4 October 1937 under the command of Kapitänleutnant Hans Eckermann, it was named in honour of Oberleutnant zur See Johannes Lohs. Lohs, a U-boat commander during World War I, died on 14 August 1918 after his submarine UB-57 was sunk by a mine.

The flotilla, under the name "Lohs Flotilla", was founded in Kiel in June 1937 and existed until December 1939. The flotilla was re-founded as "3rd Flotilla" in March 1941 with its base in Kiel. In October 1941 the flotilla was moved to La Pallice, La Rochelle in France. In August 1944 the last U-boats left the base for Norway and the flotilla was disbanded in October 1944.

Flotilla Commanders

U-Boats of the Flotilla

Notes

External links 
uboat.net – comprehensive website dedicated to U-boat history.

03
Military units and formations of the Kriegsmarine
Military units and formations established in 1937
Military units and formations disestablished in 1944